John Woodward or variant,  may refer to:

Sports 
John Woodward (English footballer) (born 1947), former footballer
John Woodward (Scottish footballer) (born 1949), former footballer
Johnny Woodward (1924–2002), English footballer
John Douglas Woodward (athlete) (1925–1995), Canadian Olympic sailor
John Woodward (rugby league), Australian rugby league player

Arts and entertainment 
Jonathan M. Woodward (born 1973), U.S. actor
John Douglas Woodward (1846–1924), American landscape artist and illustrator
John Wesley Woodward (1879–1912), musician on the RMS Titanic
John Collin Woodward (born 18 February 1961), former CEO of the UK Film Council and British Film Institute

Military 
John B. Woodward (1835–1896), U.S. Civil War colonel and Brooklyn, N.Y. political figure
Sandy Woodward (John Forster Woodward, 1932–2013), British admiral

Others 
John Woodward (lawyer) (born 1934), Australian lawyer and Environmental Commissioner
John Woodward (MP), MP for Northampton
John Woodward (naturalist) (1665–1728), English naturalist

See also
 Woodward (disambiguation)